Christopher Ré is an American computer scientist. He is currently employed by Stanford University, where he is an associate professor. He was awarded a MacArthur Fellowship in 2015. Ré specializes in big data analysis. He co-founded Lattice.io, a data mining and machine learning company that was acquired by Apple in May 2017.

References

Living people
MacArthur Fellows
Stanford University faculty
Scientists from the San Francisco Bay Area
American computer scientists
Cornell University alumni
University of Washington alumni
Year of birth missing (living people)